See
 List of birds of Georgia
 List of mammals of Georgia

See also 
 Outline of Georgia

References